The Minuet in G, Op. 14/1, is a short piano composition by Ignacy Jan Paderewski, which became world-famous, overshadowing his more major works such as the Symphony in B minor "Polonia", the Piano Concerto in A minor, and the opera Manru. 

The minuet was written in 1887, the first of six pieces making up his Humoresques de concert, Op. 14.  The full set is in two books:

Book I (à l'Antique)
 No. 1: Menuet
 No. 2: Sarabande
 No. 3: Caprice (genre Scarlatti)

Book II (moderne)
 No. 4: Burlesque
 No. 5: Intermezzo polacco
 No. 6: Cracovienne fantastique.

Recordings
In its original form as a solo piano piece, it has received a large number of recordings, from Paderewski himself, to Sergei Rachmaninoff, Josef Hofmann, Ignaz Friedman, Shura Cherkassky, through to the pianists of today such as Roger Woodward, Stephen Hough and Adam Wodnicki.

It has also been arranged for other instruments: 
 Fritz Kreisler arranged it for violin and piano, and recorded it with the composer at the piano
 Gaspar Cassadó arranged it for cello and piano.
 The John Philip Sousa band performed a transcription of the piece in Rochester, NY on November 12, 1894.

Sheet music

Notes

Compositions for solo piano
1887 compositions
Compositions by Ignacy Jan Paderewski
Compositions in G major